Tranceport is a DJ mix album released by Paul Oakenfold in 1998. It was released on Kinetic Records.

In 2012, Rolling Stone ranked the album at number 8 on their list of "The 30 Greatest EDM Albums Ever".

Track listing
The Dream Traveler – "Time" (Original Mix) (7:17)
Three Drives On A Vinyl – "Greece 2000" (Original Mix) (6:44)
Tilt vs. Paul van Dyk – "Rendezvous" (Quadraphonic Mix) (4:08)
Gus Gus – "Purple" (Sasha vs. The Light) (7:16)
Ascension – "Someone" (Slacker and Original Vocal Mix) (8:12)
Agnelli & Nelson – "El Niño" (Matt Darey 12" Mix) (7:49)
Energy 52 – "Café Del Mar" (Three N One Remix) (7:21)
Binary Finary – "1998" (Original Mix / Paul Van Dyk Mix) (5:12)
Paul van Dyk featuring Toni Halliday – "Words (For Love)" (Original Mix) (5:08)
Lost Tribe – "Gamemaster" (Original Mix) (7:03)
Transa – "Enervate" (Original Mix) (7:11)

References

External links

Paul Oakenfold compilation albums
1998 compilation albums
Kinetic Records compilation albums